Constantin Dudu Drugă (born 27 February 1990) is a Romanian professional footballer who plays as a defender.

Honours

Dante Botoșani 
Liga III: 2021–22

References

External links
 
 

1990 births
Living people
People from Roman, Romania
Romanian footballers
Association football defenders
Liga I players
Liga II players
Liga III players
CSM Ceahlăul Piatra Neamț players
FCV Farul Constanța players
FC Botoșani players
ACS Foresta Suceava players
CS Pandurii Târgu Jiu players
ACS Viitorul Târgu Jiu players
CS Aerostar Bacău players